Rolland Franklin "Rollie" Williams (October 11, 1897 – April 5, 1968) was an American football, basketball, and baseball player and coach.  He played professional football in the National Football League (NFL) for the Racine Legion in 1923. He played football, baseball and basketball at the University of Wisconsin–Madison.  Williams was the head football, basketball, and baseball coach at Millikin University during the 1923–24 academic year.  He served two stints as the head basketball coach at the University of Iowa, from 1929 to 1942 and again for the 1950–51 season.  He was inducted in the Wisconsin Athletic Hall of Fame in 1960.

Williams was born in Edgerton, Wisconsin on October 11, 1897.  He died on April 5, 1968, of a heart attack at his home in North Liberty, Iowa. Apart from a 40-month tour in the Navy during World War II, he spent 42 years at Iowa as an assistant coach (1924-1929), head coach (1929-1942 and 1950-1951) and assistant athletic director (1945-1966).

Head coaching record

Football

Basketball

References

External links
 

1897 births
1968 deaths
American football halfbacks
American men's basketball players
Baseball players from Wisconsin
Basketball coaches from Wisconsin
Basketball players from Wisconsin
Iowa Hawkeyes football coaches
Iowa Hawkeyes men's basketball coaches
Millikin Big Blue baseball coaches
Millikin Big Blue football coaches
Millikin Big Blue men's basketball coaches
People from Edgerton, Wisconsin
Players of American football from Wisconsin
Racine Legion players
Wisconsin Badgers baseball players
Wisconsin Badgers football players
Wisconsin Badgers men's basketball players